Reginaldo may refer to:

 Maicosuel Reginaldo de Matos (born 1986), footballer
 Reginaldo Araújo (born 1977), Brazilian defender
 Reginaldo de Santana (born 1975), Brazilian football player
 Reginaldo (footballer born 1983) full name Reginaldo Ferreira da Silva, Brazilian football striker
 Reginaldo (footballer, born 1993), Brazilian football right-back
 Piá (footballer born 1973), full name Reginaldo Revelino Jandoso (born 1973), Brazilian football midfielder

See also

 Reginald (disambiguation)